USAPA may refer to:

US Airline Pilots Association
USA Patriot Act
United States Amateur Pickleball Association or USA Pickleball Association, previous names of USA Pickleball